Jamie Hamilton (born 24 March 1991, in Ballymena) is a Northern Irish motorcycle road racer. He competed in International road races aboard a Suzuki GSX-R1000, a Honda CBR600RR and a Kawasaki ER6. Hamilton suffered major injuries when crashing during the TT races in June 2015, and was discharged from Royal Victoria Hospital, Belfast in August, needing future surgery to extend his badly-broken leg.

Career
He initially pursued a career as a footballer playing for Leicester City under 9's, and Bolton Wanderers under 11's. However after being taken to a local motocross track in his home town, he was spotted by Harry Corbett, a professional Motocross race team manager and from there progressed to Mini-motos, where he won multiple races, and from there to short circuit racing, and real road racing in Ireland and the Isle of Man TT races.

Starting off
In 2004, at age 13, he won his first race in the Aprilia 125 club race at Nutts Corner. In 2005 he finished 8th in the Aprilia superteam championship with one win at Knockhill that year. In 2006 he competed in the CB500 Superclub and club championships where he finished first in the club championship, and second in the superclub championship, breaking the lap record at multiple tracks over the course of the season.

British Supersport & Superstock 600
In 2007 he competed in the British Supersport 600 championship, setting the world record as the youngest racer ever to compete in British Supersport. He was treated for minor injuries for his involvement in the incident that killed Guy Sanders at Mondello Park.

In 2008 he competed in British Superstock riding for MSS Colchester Kawasaki, where he finished 3rd in his first race of the season at Thruxton, and later clinching 4th place at Donington.

In 2009 Hamilton raced in the Metzeler National Superstock 600 Championship for Gearlink Kawasaki, the official KMUK British Supersport team. Hamilton started riding for Gearlink Kawasaki in the 3rd round and went on to win the championship.

Career statistics

British Supersport Championship
(key) (Races in bold indicate pole position) (Races in italics indicate fastest lap)

References

External links
official website

Living people
1991 births
Sportspeople from Ballymena
British Supersport Championship riders
Motorcycle racers from Northern Ireland